The Sieniawski family (plural: Sieniawscy, feminine form: Sieniawska) was a Polish szlachta family. They were magnates in the First Republic of Poland. Their properties were inherited by the Czartoryski family after the family expired in the 18th century.

Coat of arms
The Sieniawski family used the Leliwa coat of arms.

Notable members
Świętosław Sieniawski
Gunter Sieniawski (died c. 1494), Judge of Lwów
Rafał Sieniawski (died 1518), Chorąży of the Crown, married Agnieszka Cebrowska z Cebra h. Hołobok
Mikołaj Sieniawski (1489–1569), Great Hetman of the Crown, married Katarzyna Koła h. Junosza
Hieronim Jarosz Sieniawski (c. 1516 – 1587), voivode of the Ruthenian Voivodship, married firstly Elżbieta Radziwiłł h. Trąby, secondly Hanna Zasławska h. Pogoń Litewska, thirdly Anna Maciejowska h. Ciołek, fourthly Jadwiga Tarło h. Topór
Adam Hieronim Sieniawski (1576–1619), podczaszy of the Crown, married Katarzyna Kostka h. Dąbrowa
Mikołaj Sieniawski (died 1636), podczaszy of the Crown, deputy of the Sejm, married Urszula Zofia Krotska h. Leszczyc
Prokop Sieniawski (1602–1626), Court chorąży of the Crown, married Anna Eufrozyna Chodkiewicz h. Kościesza
Adam Hieronim Sieniawski (1623–1650) starost of Lwów and Crown Field Clerk, married Wiktoria Elżbieta Potocka h. Piława
Mikołaj Hieronim Sieniawski (1645–1683), Field Hetman of the Crown, married Cecylia Maria Radziwiłł h. Trąby
Adam Mikołaj Sieniawski (1666–1726), Great Hetman of the Crown, married Elżbieta Helena Sieniawska (1669–1729)
Maria Zofia Sieniawska (1699–1777), last member of the Sieniawski family. Wife of Stanisław Ernest Denhoff, and since 1731 married to August Aleksander Czartoryski
Mikołaj Sieniawski (c. 1520 – 1584), Field Hetman of the Crown, married Hanna Sapieha h. Lis
Rafał Sieniawski (died 1592), castellan of Kamieniec Podolski, married firstly Katarzyna Dziaduska h. Jelita and secondly Zofia Chodkiewicz h. Kościesza
Aleksander Sieniawski (c. 1490 – 1568), stolnik of Lwów, Field Watchman of the Crown
Prokop Sieniawski (died 1566), stolnik of Lwów, married Anna Lwowska h. Nałęcz
Prokop Sieniawski (died 1596), Court Marshal of the Crown, married Elżbieta Gostomska h. Nałęcz
Zofia Sieniawska (1591–1629), Benedictine abbess in Sandomierz

Palaces

Bibliography
K. Kuśmierz, Sieniawa. Założenia Rezydencjonalne Sieniawskich, Kraków, 1984 r.

External links
http://genealogia.grocholski.pl/gd/rodzina.php?id=04648&string=&nr=0